Chah Quski (also Romanized as Chāh Qūskī) is a village in Sharifabad Rural District, in the Central District of Sirjan County, Kerman Province, Iran. At the 2006 census, its population was 62, with 18 families.

References 

Populated places in Sirjan County